Plaza de toros de Zaragoza is a bullring in Zaragoza, Spain. It is currently used for bull fighting. The stadium holds 10,072 spectators. It was opened in 1764.

References

Zaragoza
Sports venues in Aragon
Buildings and structures in Zaragoza